Eliada W. Brown (January 8, 1840 – May 4, 1902) was a Wisconsin farmer and politician. A Republican, he was a member of the Wisconsin State Assembly from 1883 to 1885.

Biography
Eliada White Brown was born in Berlin, Vermont on January 8, 1840. He was educated in the local schools and became a farmer. In 1872, he relocated to Weyauwega, Wisconsin. A Republican, he was chairman of his town board for four years and also served as a county supervisor. Brown represented the first district of Waupaca County in the Wisconsin State Assembly from 1883 to 1885.

In 1897, Brown was appointed as Weyauwega's postmaster, and he remained in this position until his death. Brown was also active in several business ventures, and at the time of his death was vice president and a director of the Weyauwega Trunk and Bag Company. He died in Weyauwega on May 4, 1902, and was buried at Oakwood Cemetery in Weyauwega.

References

People from Berlin, Vermont
People from Weyauwega, Wisconsin
Republican Party members of the Wisconsin State Assembly
Wisconsin city council members
1840 births
1902 deaths